Ernest Charles Arnason (born July 15, 1951) is a Canadian former professional ice hockey right wing who played 401 games over eight seasons in the National Hockey League for the Montreal Canadiens, Atlanta Flames, Pittsburgh Penguins, Kansas City Scouts, Cleveland Barons, Colorado Rockies, Minnesota North Stars and Washington Capitals.
He was the first player in NHL history to play for five defunct teams.

Personal life
Arnason was born in Dauphin, Manitoba and raised in Ashern, Manitoba. 

Arnason and his wife Leanne have two children, a son, Tyler who played in the NHL from 2001 to 2009 and a daughter, Aubrey who is an actress and screenwriter.

Awards and achievements
MJHL Goal Scoring Leader (1969)
WCHL Scoring Champion (1971)
WCHL Goals Leader (1971)
WCHL All-Star Team (1971)
Honoured Member of the Manitoba Hockey Hall of Fame

Career statistics

Regular season and playoffs

Transactions
On June 10, 1971 the Montreal Canadiens selected Chuck Arnason in the first-round (#7 overall) of the 1971 NHL draft.
On May 29, 1973 the Montreal Canadiens traded Chuck Arnason to the Atlanta Flames in exchange for a 1974 first-round pick (#10-Rick Chartraw).
On January 4, 1974 the Atlanta Flames traded Chuck Arnason and Bob Paradise to the Pittsburgh Penguins in exchange for Al McDonough.
On January 9, 1976 the Pittsburgh Penguins traded Chuck Arnason, Steve Durbano and a 1976 first-round pick (#11-Paul Gardner) to the Kansas City Scouts in exchange for Simon Nolet, Ed Gilbert and a 1976 first-round pick (#2-Blair Chapman).
On July 15, 1976 the Kansas City Scouts moved to Colorado and renamed Colorado Rockies.
On January 9, 1978 the Colorado Rockies traded Chuck Arnason and Rick Jodzio to the Cleveland Barons in exchange for Ralph Klassen and Fred Ahern.
On June 15, 1978 Chuck Arnason was placed on the Minnesota North Stars reserve list following Cleveland Barons/Minnesota North Stars merger.
On March 12, 1979 the Minnesota North Stars traded Chuck Arnason to the Washington Capitals for future considerations.
On April 24, 1979 the Washington Capitals traded Chuck Arnason to the Minnesota North Stars for future considerations.
On July 19, 1979 the Minnesota North Stars traded Chuck Arnason to the Vancouver Canucks for cash.

References

External links
 
 Profile at hockeydraftcentral.com

1951 births
Living people
Atlanta Flames players
Canadian ice hockey right wingers
Cleveland Barons (NHL) players
Colorado Rockies (NHL) players
Flin Flon Bombers players
Ice hockey people from Manitoba
Kansas City Scouts players
Minnesota North Stars players
Montreal Canadiens draft picks
Montreal Canadiens players
National Hockey League first-round draft picks
Sportspeople from Dauphin, Manitoba
People from Interlake Region, Manitoba
Pittsburgh Penguins players
Washington Capitals players